Tom McBride (October 7, 1952 − September 24, 1995) was an American photographer, model, and actor.  He starred in the 1981 horror film Friday the 13th Part 2 as Mark. He also had a role in the 1985 movie Remo Williams: The Adventure Begins. His only TV guest appearance was on the TV series Highway to Heaven. On Broadway, he appeared in the play Fifth of July near the end of its run. McBride, an openly gay man, died in 1995 due to complications from AIDS, only two weeks prior to his forty-third birthday. A documentary by director Jay Corcoran titled Life & Death on the A-List followed McBride in the final months of his life.

McBride is also remembered for his modeling career as one of the famous handsome hunks in Winston Cigarette billboard ads in the 1980s.

Filmography

Film

Television

References

External links

1952 births
1995 deaths
American male film actors
American gay actors
LGBT people from West Virginia
Place of birth missing
20th-century American male actors
AIDS-related deaths in New York (state)
20th-century American LGBT people